Hibbertia coloensis is a species of flowering plant in the family Dilleniaceae and is endemic to the Wollemi National Park of New South Wales. It is a shrub with linear to lance-shaped leaves, and yellow flowers arranged in leaf axils, with twenty-four to twenty-six stamens arranged around three carpels.

Description
There are twenty-four to twenty-six stamens arranged around the three hairy carpels, each carpel with six ovules. Flowering has been observed in October.

Taxonomy
Hibbertia coloensis was first formally described in 2013 by Hellmut R. Toelken in the Journal of the Adelaide Botanic Gardens from specimens collected by Peter Weston in 2008. The specific epithet (coloensis) refers to the location of the type specimens.

Distribution and habitat
This hibbertia grows in woodland in sand along the Colo River in Wollemi National Park, New South Wales.

See also
List of Hibbertia species

References

coloensis
Flora of New South Wales
Plants described in 2013
Taxa named by Hellmut R. Toelken